The Bundesvision Song Contest 2007 was the third edition of the annual Bundesvision Song Contest musical event. The contest was held on 9 February 2007 at the Tempodrom in Berlin, following Seeed's win in the 2006 contest in Hesse with the song "Ding". The contest was hosted by Stefan Raab, Johanna Klum, and Elton in the green room.

The participants were announced by ProSieben on 28 November 2006. On 15 January 2007, Stefan Raab began presenting each participant and their state on his show TV total for four weeks.

The contest was originally to take place on Saturday 10 February, but was brought forward by a day so to not clash with Deutschland sucht den Superstar.

For the first time, all participants were, with one exception (the band Beatplanet), from the states they represented. Returning artists include: Marta Jandová (2005; with Apocalyptica), and Suzie Kerstgens (2005; member from Klee). Both representing different states than their first participation in 2005.

The winner of the Bundesvision Song Contest 2007 was Oomph! feat. Marta Jandová with the song "Träumst du?", representing Lower Saxony. In second place was Jan Delay representing Hamburg, and third place to Kim Frank representing Schleswig-Holstein.

14 of the 16 states awarded themselves the maximum of 12 points, with Brandenburg, and Rhineland-Palatinate, awarding themselves 10 points each.

The contest was broadcast by ProSieben and watched by 2.04 million people (7.6% market share). In the 14-49 age range 1.72 million people watched the contest (16.3% market share).


Results

Scoreboard

Spokespersons 

Berlin - Söhnlein B.
Hesse - Nadja Gontermann & Nicolas Sawatzki
Mecklenburg-Vorpommern - Dirk Steigemann & Kathrin Feistner
Saxony - André Hardt
Saarland - Martina Straten & Tom Sörens
Brandenburg - Ken Jebsen
North Rhine-Westphalia - Claudia Barbonus
Rhineland-Palatinate - Hans Blomberg
Lower Saxony - Frank Schambor & Susan Hammann 
Baden-Württemberg - Jonathan Schächter
Bremen - Judith Hildebrandt
Bavaria - Bene Gutjan & Schummi
Schleswig-Holstein - Danny Peters & Kaya Laß
Hamburg - Christian Aust 
Thuringia - Tommi
Saxony-Anhalt - Thomas Schminke & Katja Feller

References

External links
 Official BSC website at tvtotal.de

2007
Bundesvision Song Contest
2007 song contests